The following is a list of men's champions of the Western Collegiate Hockey Association, including champions of the conference's playoff tournament, the WCHA Final Five.

Championships by season

Championships by school

Colorado College won its first NCAA national championship in 1950 prior to the founding of the Midwest Collegiate Hockey League.  Likewise, Michigan won its 1948 title prior to the start of league play. North Dakota won a national title in 1959 as an independent. The Wolverines won two additional national championships in 1996 and 1998 after leaving the WCHA for the CCHA. Michigan State also won its 1986 and 2007 national championships after leaving the WCHA. Two of the five schools that made their WCHA debuts in 2013, Bowling Green and Lake Superior State, won all of their national championships while in the CCHA (one for Bowling Green in 1984, and three for Lake Superior State in 1988, 1992, and 1994).

Location of Men's WCHA tournaments
1988 thru 1993: St. Paul Civic Center, St. Paul MN
1994: Bradley Center, Milwaukee WI
1995: St. Paul Civic Center
1996: Bradley Center
1997: St. Paul Civic Center
1998: Bradley Center
1999 thru 2000: Target Center, Minneapolis MN
2001 thru 2013: Xcel Energy Center, St. Paul MN
2014: Van Andel Arena, Grand Rapids MI
2015: Xcel Energy Center
2016: Van Andel Arena
2017 thru 2019: Campus Sites

References

Champions, men